Chanchal Assembly constituency is an assembly constituency in Malda district in the Indian state of West Bengal.

Overview
As per orders of the Delimitation Commission, No. 45 Chanchal Assembly constituency covers Chanchal I community development block and Barui, Kusidha, Rashidabad and Tulsihatta gram panchayats of  Harishchandrapur I community development block.

Chanchal Assembly constituency is part of No. 7 Maldaha Uttar (Lok Sabha constituency).

Members of Legislative Assembly

For MLAs from the area in previous years see Kharba Assembly constituency

Election results

2021

2011
In the 2011 election, Asif Mehbub of Congress defeated his nearest rival Anjuman Ara Begum of CPI(M).

References

Assembly constituencies of West Bengal
Politics of Malda district